Haageocereus is a genus of cacti endemic to the lower elevations of the extremely dry desert along the coast of Peru and northern Chile.

Species 
As of 2021 species include:

Natural Hybrids

Synonymy 
The following genera have been brought into synonymy with Haagerocereus:
Floresia Krainz & F.Ritter ex Backeb. (nom. inval.)
Haageocactus Backeb. (nom. inval.)
Lasiocereus F.Ritter
Neobinghamia Backeb.
Peruvocereus Akers

References 

The Cactus Family, By Edward F. Anderson, Wilhelm Barthlott, Roger Brown
http://cactiguide.com/cactus/?genus=Haageocereus

 
Cactoideae genera
Cacti of South America
Flora of Chile
Flora of Peru